Game On may refer to:

Film and television 
 Game On (2002 game show), an American game show
 Game On! (2020 game show), an American game show
 Game On (British TV series), a 1995–1998 sitcom
 Game On (Canadian game show), a 1998–2000 game show
 Game On (Canadian TV series), a 2015 comedy series
 Game: On, a 2004 live action and machinima short film for Volvo Cars
 Game On, a 2016 YouTube video series by Tom Scott
 "Game On", a 2010 promotional music video for the web series The Guild

Television episodes
 "Game On" (Aaron Stone)
 "Game On" (Hit the Floor)
 "Game On" (Homeland)
 "Game On" (Switched at Birth)
 "Game On" (The West Wing)

Literature 
 Game On, a 2009 novel in the High School Musical book series

Music
 Game On! (album), by Tina Guo, 2017
 Game On (EP), by the James Barker Band, 2017
 "Game On" (song), by Catatonia, 1998
 "Game On!", a song by Waka Flocka Flame featuring Good Charlotte from the Pixels film soundtrack, 2015

Video gaming 
 Game On (exhibition), an international touring exhibition on the history of video games
 Game-On, a series of conferences on simulation and AI in computer games
 Game On Expo, an annual gaming convention in Phoenix, Arizona, US
 Game On! USA, a gaming magazine published by Viz Media in 1996
 Game On!, a 2012 video game podcast on the TWiT network